White Car may refer to:
"White Car", a 1987 song by Cabaret Voltaire from Code
"White Car", a 2006 song by Viva Death from One Percent Panic
"White Car", a 1980 song by Yes from Drama
"White Car", a chapter of Case Closed

See also
Black Car (disambiguation)
Car colour popularity
White Cat (disambiguation)
White Motor Company, former American automobile manufacturer
Whitecar Coaches, a defunct Australian bus company